North Palmyra Township (T12N R8W) is located in Macoupin County, Illinois, United States. As of the 2010 census, its population was 854 and it contained 388 housing units.

Geography

Demographics

Adjacent townships
 Road District No. 13, Morgan County, Illinois (north)
 Talkington Township, Sangamon County (northeast)
 North Otter Township (east)
 South Otter Township (southeast)
 South Palmyra Township (south)
 Barr Township (southwest)
 Scottville Township (west)
 Road District No. 12, Morgan County, Illinois (northwest)

References

External links
US Census
City-data.com
Illinois State Archives

Townships in Macoupin County, Illinois
Townships in Illinois